Christopher Pratt (1935–2022) was a Canadian painter.

Christopher Pratt or Chris Pratt may refer to:

 Christopher Dale Pratt (born 1956), British business executive
 Chris Pratt (born 1979), American actor
 Chris Pratt (sailor) (born 1959), Australian Olympic sailor
 Christopher Pratt (sailor), French sailor, 6th place in the 2008 Solitaire du Figaro
 Chris Pratt (show jumping rider) (born 1969), Canadian show jumping rider
 Chris Pratt, a character in The Lookout (2007 film)

See also
Chris Prat, lacrosse player